This is the discography of English singer Michael Ball. Listed are all the singles and albums in order of their release with their United Kingdom peak chart positions.

Albums

Studio albums

Compilation albums

Video albums

Extended plays

Singles

References

Ball, Michael